Empis grisea is a species of fly in the family Empididae.  It is included in the subgenus Leptempis. It is found in the  Palearctic.

References

Empis
Insects described in 1816
Asilomorph flies of Europe